Bobby Darin (born Walden Robert Cassotto; May 14, 1936 – December 20, 1973) was an American musician and actor. He performed jazz, pop, rock and roll, folk, swing, and country music.

He started his career as a songwriter for Connie Francis. He recorded his first million-selling single, "Splish Splash", in 1958. That was followed by "Dream Lover", "Mack the Knife", and "Beyond the Sea", which brought him worldwide fame. In 1962, he won a Golden Globe Award for his first film, Come September, co-starring his first wife, actress Sandra Dee.

During the 1960s, he became more politically active and worked on Robert F. Kennedy's Democratic presidential campaign. He was present at the Ambassador Hotel in Los Angeles at the time of Robert Kennedy's assassination in June 1968. During the same year, he discovered the woman who had raised him was his grandmother, not his mother as he thought, and learned that the woman he thought was his sister was actually his mother. Those events deeply affected Darin and sent him into a long period of seclusion. 

Although he made a successful comeback (in television) in the early 1970s, his health was beginning to fail following bouts of rheumatic fever in childhood. The knowledge of his vulnerability had always spurred him on to use his musical talent while still young. He died at the age of 37 after a heart operation in Los Angeles in 1973.

Early years
Walden Robert Cassotto was born on May 14, 1936, in the East Harlem neighborhood of New York City. His maternal grandfather, Saverio Antonio "Big Sam Curly" Cassotto (born January 26, 1882), who was of Italian descent and who died in prison from pneumonia a year before Darin's birth, was a made man and "soldier" in the Genovese Crime Family, and a close associate of Frank Costello, apparently serving as a witness at Costello's 1914 wedding, though the relationship soured after he accused Costello of withholding money that was meant for Cassotto's family. His maternal grandmother, Vivian Fern Walden, who called herself "Polly" and was born in 1891, was of English, Danish, and Norwegian ancestry. She was a vaudeville singer. Darin's birth mother, Vanina Juliette "Nina" Cassotto (born November 30, 1917), became pregnant with him in the summer of 1935, when she was 17. Nina and her mother hatched a plan to pass her baby off as Nina's younger brother.

Darin believed his mother Nina was instead his elder sister and that Polly, who had raised him from birth, was his mother.  In 1968, when he was 32 and considering entering politics, Nina told him the truth, reportedly devastating Darin. She refused to reveal the identity of his biological father, and kept that secret to her death in 1983.

By the time he was a teenager, Darin could play several instruments, including piano, drums, and guitar. He later added harmonica and xylophone.

Darin moved to the Bronx early in his life (with a rented summer home in Staten Island) and graduated from the prestigious Bronx High School of Science. In later years he attributed his arrogance to his experiences there, where he was surrounded by brighter students who teased him. He then enrolled at Hunter College and soon gravitated to the drama department. After only two semesters, he dropped out to pursue an acting career.

Bobby took the name of Darin when he began to record, adapting it from the first name of actor Darren McGavin, TV's Mike Hammer, however also adding, "My legal name will remain Cassotto. Cassotto was my mother's name, and it will be my children's name."

Music career
Darin's career took off with a songwriting partnership, formed in 1955 with Don Kirshner, whom he met at a candy store in Washington Heights. They wrote jingles and songs, beginning with "Bubblegum Pop". In 1956, his agent negotiated a contract with Decca Records. The songs recorded at Decca had minimal commercial success.

A member of the Brill Building gang of struggling songwriters, Darin was introduced to singer Connie Francis, for whom he helped write several songs. They developed a romantic interest, but her father was not fond of Darin and did not approve of the relationship, and the couple split up. At one point, Darin wanted to elope immediately; Francis has said that not marrying Darin was the biggest mistake of her life.

Darin left Decca to sign with Atlantic Records' Atco subsidiary, where he wrote and arranged music for himself and others. Songs he recorded, such as Harry Warren's "I Found a Million Dollar Baby", were sung in an Elvis style, which did not suit his personality.

Guided by Atlantic's star-maker Ahmet Ertegun, Darin's career finally took off in 1958 when he recorded "Splish Splash". He co-wrote the song with radio D.J. Murray Kaufman after a phone call from Kaufman's mother, Jean, a frustrated songwriter. Her latest song idea was: "Splish, Splash, Take a Bath". Both Kaufman and Darin felt the title was lackluster, but Darin, with few options, said "I could write a song with that title." Within one hour, Darin had written "Splish Splash". The single, Darin's first successful foray into the rock and roll genre, sold more than a million copies. His partnership with Kirshner, who was not involved in the writing of that song, ended at that time. He made another recording in 1958 for Brunswick Records with a band called The Ding Dongs. With the success of "Splish Splash" the single was re-released by Atco Records as "Early in the Morning" with the band renamed as The Rinky Dinks. It charted, and made it to number 24 in the United States.

In 1959, Darin recorded the self-penned "Dream Lover", a ballad that became a multi-million seller. With it came financial success and the ability to demand more creative control of his career. So he meant for his That's All album to show that he could sing more than rock and roll. His next single, "Mack the Knife", the standard from Kurt Weill's Threepenny Opera, was given a vamping jazz-pop interpretation. Although Darin was initially opposed to releasing it as a single, the song went to No. 1 on the chart for nine weeks, sold two million copies, and won the Grammy Award for Record of the Year in 1960. Darin was also voted the Grammy Award for Best New Artist that year, and "Mack the Knife" has since been honored with a Grammy Hall of Fame Award.

Darin followed "Mack" with "Beyond the Sea", a jazzy English-language version of Charles Trenet's French hit song "La Mer". Both tracks were produced by Atlantic founders Ahmet and Nesuhi Ertegun with staff producer Jerry Wexler and they featured arrangements by Richard Wess.

The late-1950s success included Darin setting the all-time attendance record at the Copacabana nightclub in Manhattan and headlining at the major casinos in Las Vegas.

Darin's 1960 recording of "Artificial Flowers", a song by Sheldon Harnick and Jerry Bock from the Broadway musical Tenderloin about the death of a child laborer, featured a jazzy, big band arrangement by Richard Behrke, that was in sharp contrast to its tragic lyrics.

In the 1960s, Darin owned and operated, with Doris Day's son Terry Melcher, a music publishing and production company (TM Music/Trio). He signed Wayne Newton and gave him the song "Danke Schoen", which became Newton's breakout hit. Darin also was a mentor to Roger McGuinn, who worked for him at TM Music and played the 12-string guitar in Darin's nightclub band before forming the Byrds. Additionally, Darin produced Rosey Grier's 1964 LP Soul City, and Made in the Shade for Jimmy Boyd.

In 1962, Darin began to write and sing country music, with hit songs including "Things" (US No. 3/UK No. 2) (1962), "You're the Reason I'm Living" (US No. 3), and "18 Yellow Roses" (US No. 10). The latter two were recorded by Capitol Records, which he joined in 1962, before returning to Atlantic three years later. Darin left Capitol in 1964. In 1966, he had his final UK hit single, with a version of Tim Hardin's "If I Were A Carpenter", which peaked at No. 9 (No. 8 in the US). He performed the opening and closing songs on the soundtrack of the 1965 Walt Disney film That Darn Cat!. "Things" was sung by Dean Martin in the 1967 TV special Movin' With Nancy, starring Nancy Sinatra.

Acting career

In the fall of 1959, Darin played "Honeyboy Jones" in an early episode of Jackie Cooper's CBS military sitcom/drama Hennesey. In the same year, he became the only actor ever to have been signed to five major Hollywood film studios. He wrote music for several films in which he appeared.

His first major film, Come September (1961), was a teenager-oriented romantic comedy with Rock Hudson and Gina Lollobrigida and featuring 18-year-old actress Sandra Dee. They met during the production of the film, and got married soon afterward. Dee gave birth to a son, Dodd Mitchell Darin (also known as Morgan Mitchell) on December 16, 1961. Dee and Darin made a few films together with moderate success.

In 1961, he starred as a struggling jazz musician in Too Late Blues, John Cassavetes' first film for a major Hollywood studio. Writing in 2012, Los Angeles Times critic Dennis Lim observed that Darin was "a surprise in his first nonsinging role, willing to appear both arrogant and weak". In 1962, Darin won the Golden Globe Award for "New Star of the Year – Actor" for his role in Come September. The following year he was nominated for a Best Actor Golden Globe for Pressure Point.

In 1963, he was nominated for an Academy Award for Best Supporting Actor for his role as a shell-shocked soldier in Captain Newman, M.D.

In October 1964, he appeared as a wounded ex-convict who is befriended by an orphan girl in "The John Gillman Story" episode of NBC's Wagon Train western television series.

Later years

Darin became more politically active as the 1960s progressed, and his musical output became more "folksy". In 1966, he had a hit with folksinger Tim Hardin's "If I Were a Carpenter", securing a return to the Top 10 after a two-year absence.

Darin traveled with Robert F. Kennedy and worked on the politician's 1968 presidential campaign. He was with Kennedy the day he traveled to Los Angeles on June 4, 1968, for the California primary, and was at the Ambassador Hotel later that night when Kennedy was assassinated. That event, combined with learning about his true parentage, had a deep effect on Darin, who spent most of the next year living in seclusion in a trailer near Big Sur.

Returning to Los Angeles in 1969, Darin started his own record label which was titled Direction Records, putting out folk and protest music. Darin wrote "Simple Song of Freedom" in 1969, which, in an interesting turn of events, was first recorded by Tim Hardin and the song became Hardin's best-selling record. Darin himself sang the song "live" on several television variety shows.

Of his first Direction album, Darin said, "The purpose of Direction Records is to seek out statement-makers. The album is solely [composed] of compositions designed to reflect my thoughts on the turbulent aspects of modern society." He later signed with Motown.

Beginning on July 27, 1972, he starred in his own television variety show on NBC, Dean Martin Presents: The Bobby Darin Amusement Company, which ran for seven episodes ending on September 7, 1972. Beginning on January 19, 1973, he starred in a similar show on NBC called The Bobby Darin Show. That show ran for 13 episodes ending on April 27, 1973. Darin subsequently made television guest appearances and remained a top draw.

Other interests
Darin was an enthusiastic chess player. His television show included an occasional segment in which he would explain a chess move. He arranged with the United States Chess Federation to sponsor a grandmaster tournament, which pitted him against the young Eastern Division champion Stephen Ryder, with the largest prize fund in history, but the event was canceled after his death.

Personal life
Darin married actress Sandra Dee on December 1, 1960. They met while filming Come September (which was released in 1961). On December 16, 1961, they had a son, Dodd Mitchell Darin (also known as Morgan Mitchell Darin). Dee and Darin divorced on March 7, 1967.

Darin's second wife was Andrea Yeager, a legal secretary whom he met in 1970 and married on June 25, 1973, after the couple had lived together for three years. Four months later, in October 1973, the couple divorced amid strain caused by Darin's worsening health problems.

Health
Darin had poor health throughout his entire life. He was frail as an infant and, beginning at age eight, had recurring bouts of rheumatic fever that left him with a seriously weakened heart. During his first heart surgery in January 1971, he had two artificial valves implanted, then spent most of that year recovering from the surgery.

During the last few years of his life, he was often administered oxygen during and after his performances on stage and screen.

Death
In 1973, after failing to take antibiotics to protect his heart before a dental visit, Darin developed sepsis, an overwhelming systemic infection, which further weakened his body and affected one of his heart valves. On December 11, he checked himself into Cedars of Lebanon Hospital in Los Angeles for another round of open-heart surgery to repair the two artificial heart valves he had received in January 1971. On the evening of December 19, a four-person surgical team worked for over six hours to repair his damaged heart. Shortly after the surgery ended in the early morning hours of December 20, 1973, Darin died in the recovery room without regaining consciousness. He was 37 years old.

Darin's last wish in his will was that his body be donated to science for medical research. His remains were transferred to the UCLA Medical Center shortly after his death.

Legacy
In 1990, Darin was inducted into the Rock and Roll Hall of Fame, with singer and close friend Paul Anka announcing the honor. In 1999, Darin was voted into the Songwriters Hall of Fame.

Songwriter Alan O'Day alluded to Darin and his recording of "Mack the Knife" in the song "Rock and Roll Heaven" (made a hit by the Righteous Brothers), a tribute to dead musicians, which O'Day wrote shortly after Darin's death.

On May 14, 2007, Darin was awarded a star on the Las Vegas Walk of Stars to honor his contribution to making Las Vegas the "Entertainment Capital of the World" and named him one of the twentieth century's greatest entertainers. Fans paid for the star. Darin also has a star on the Hollywood Walk of Fame.

On December 13, 2009, at its 2010 Grammy Awards ceremony, the Recording Academy awarded Darin a posthumous Lifetime Achievement Award.

Biopic

In 1986, director Barry Levinson intended to direct a film based on Darin's life, and had begun preproduction on the project by early 1997. He abandoned the project, the rights to which were subsequently bought by actor Kevin Spacey, along with Darin's son, Dodd. The resultant biopic, Beyond the Sea, starred Spacey as Darin, with the actor using his own singing voice for the musical numbers. The film covers much of Darin's life and career, including his marriage to Sandra Dee, portrayed by Kate Bosworth.

With the consent of the Darin estate and former Darin manager Steve Blauner, Beyond the Sea opened at the 2004 Toronto International Film Festival. Although Dodd Darin, Sandra Dee, and Blauner responded enthusiastically to Spacey's work and the film was strongly promoted by the studio, Beyond the Sea received mixed-to-poor reviews upon wide release, and box office results were disappointing. Spacey, however, was nominated for the Golden Globe Award for Best Actor—Motion Picture Musical or Comedy, but the award that year went to Jamie Foxx for his portrayal of Darin's musical contemporary Ray Charles.

Musical
In September 2016, Dream Lover: The Bobby Darin Musical had its world premiere at Sydney Lyric Theatre, Australia. The production featured the story of Darin with an 18-piece big band. Darin was played by David Campbell. Darin had an unusual upbringing, being raised by a "mother" who was actually his grandmother and alongside a "sister" who was actually his mother, a fact he did not discover until he was 31 years old. Campbell grew up in a similar circumstance, leading Bobby's son Dodd Darin to describe Campbell as perfect for the role, stating, "You have to have lived something like that to understand it and [Campbell] has, and I think he can relate to my dad, he can relate to the pain." Campbell made similar observations, describing playing Darin as a "cathartic experience" and stating, "I feel like I'm healing things during this show." The production was nominated in six categories in the 18th Helpmann Awards, including for Best Musical, with Campbell receiving the Helpmann Award for Best Male Actor in a Musical.

Discography

Studio albums

 Bobby Darin (1958)
 That's All (1959)
 This is Darin (1960)
 For Teenagers Only (1960)
 The 25th Day of December (1960)
 Two of a Kind (1961)
 Love Swings (1961)
 Twist with Bobby Darin (1961)
 Bobby Darin Sings Ray Charles (1962)
 Things and Other Things (1962)
 Oh! Look at Me Now (1962)
 You're the Reason I'm Living (1963)
 It's You or No One (1963)
 18 Yellow Roses (1963)
 Earthy! (1963)
 Golden Folk Hits (1963)
 Winners (1964)
 From Hello Dolly to Goodbye Charlie (1964)
 Venice Blue (1965)
 Bobby Darin Sings The Shadow of Your Smile (1966)
 In a Broadway Bag (Mame) (1966)
 If I Were a Carpenter (1966)
 Inside Out (1967)
 Bobby Darin Sings Doctor Dolittle (1967)
 Bobby Darin Born Walden Robert Cassotto (1968)
 Commitment (1969)
 Bobby Darin (1972)

Filmography
 Pepe (1960)
 Come September (1961)
 Too Late Blues (1961)
 State Fair (1962)
 Hell Is for Heroes (1962)
 If a Man Answers (1962)
 Pressure Point (1962)
 Captain Newman, M.D. (1963)
 That Funny Feeling (1965)
 Gunfight in Abilene (1967)
 Stranger in the House (1967)
 The Happy Ending (1969)
 Happy Mother's Day, Love George (1973)

Books
 Dodd Darin and Maxine Paetro: Dream Lovers: the Magnificent Shattered Lives of Bobby Darin and Sandra Dee. New York: Warner Books, 1994. 
 David Evanier: Roman Candle: The Life of Bobby Darin. Albany, NY: SUNY Press, 2010. 
 Shane Brown: "Bobby Darin: Directions. A Listener's Guide: 2nd edition". 2018

References

External links

 Bobby Darin Official website
 
 The Bobby Darin Underground: Ultimate Resource for All Bobby Darin Music
 
 "Beyond the Sea" (2004) Hollywood movie on the life of Bobby Darin
 Bobby Darin interview recorded November 5, 1967 on the Pop Chronicles

 
1936 births
1973 deaths
American crooners
American male singer-songwriters
American country singer-songwriters
American jazz singers
American male pop singers
American rock singers
American male film actors
American impressionists (entertainers)
New Star of the Year (Actor) Golden Globe winners
Grammy Lifetime Achievement Award winners
Decca Records artists
Atlantic Records artists
Atco Records artists
Motown artists
Capitol Records artists
Brunswick Records artists
People from the Bronx
People from East Harlem
Male actors from New York City
People from Staten Island
The Bronx High School of Science alumni
Hunter College alumni
Musicians from the Bronx
Musicians from Los Angeles
American people of Italian descent
American people of English descent
American jazz musicians
California Democrats
20th-century American male actors
20th-century American singers
Singer-songwriters from New York (state)
Singer-songwriters from California
Comedians from California
Comedians from New York (state)
20th-century American comedians
Jazz musicians from New York (state)
Jazz musicians from California
Country musicians from California
Country musicians from New York (state)
20th-century American male singers
American male jazz musicians
Traditional pop music singers